Events from the year 1760 in Sweden

Incumbents
 Monarch – Adolf Frederick

Events

 The assembly of the Riksdag of the Estates.

Births

 5 June – Johan Gadolin, chemist, physicist and mineralogist  (died 1852) 
 19 May – Antoine Bournonville, ballet dancer  (died 1843) 
 29 May – Charlotte Slottsberg, ballerina  (died 1800) 
 2 March - Christina Charlotta Cederström, artist  (died 1832)   
 September - Olof Swartz,  botanist and taxonomist  (died 1818) 
 October  - Fredrica Löf, actress and courtesan  (died 1813) 
 2 March - Helena Maria Ehrenstråhle, poet  (died 1800)
 date unknown - Christina Rahm, opera singer and actress (died 1837)

Deaths

References

External links

 
Years of the 18th century in Sweden
Sweden